The henna-hooded foliage-gleaner (Clibanornis erythrocephalus) is a species of bird in the family Furnariidae. It is found in southwestern Ecuador and northwestern Peru.

Its natural habitats are subtropical or tropical dry forest and subtropical or tropical moist lowland forest. It is threatened by habitat loss.

References

henna-hooded foliage-gleaner
Birds of Ecuador
Birds of Peru
Birds of the Tumbes-Chocó-Magdalena
henna-hooded foliage-gleaner
Taxonomy articles created by Polbot